Mike Newell (born May 26, 1951) is an American college basketball coach, currently men's head coach at Dillard University in New Orleans, Louisiana.

Newell played college basketball for Sam Houston State. His coaching break came as an assistant to Billy Tubbs at Oklahoma, who hired him away from San Jacinto College. After four years at OU, Newell became head coach at Arkansas–Little Rock, a program that had experienced little success. The Trojans notably upset heavily-favored Notre Dame in the 1986 NCAA tournament. After six seasons in Little Rock, Newell was named head coach at Lamar, on former Cardinals coach Tubbs' recommendation. However, three seasons later Newell resigned under allegations of verbal abuse towards players.

Newell took several years off from coaching, returning to lead West Alabama in 2011. After two years with the Tigers and nine seasons at Arkansas–Monticello, Newell was hired as head coach at NAIA school Dillard in 2015 following a season where the Bleu Devils won only five games. In only his second season, Newell led the team to a Gulf Coast Athletic Conference title.

References

1951 births
Living people
American men's basketball coaches
American men's basketball players
Arkansas–Monticello Boll Weevils basketball coaches
College men's basketball head coaches in the United States
Continental Basketball Association coaches
Dillard Bleu Devils basketball coaches
Junior college men's basketball coaches in the United States
Lamar Cardinals basketball coaches
Little Rock Trojans men's basketball coaches
Oklahoma Sooners men's basketball coaches
Sam Houston Bearkats men's basketball players
West Alabama Tigers men's basketball coaches